Terrace Heights Hospital was a privately owned 166-bed hospital in Hollis, Queens that opened in 1947 and closed in 1984.

The hospital was a "general medical facility"

History
In 1976, they were told by New York's State Health Department that "its obstetric and pediatric services might be shut down" because of under-utilization;

In 1979, they were on a list of 10 hospitals the state wanted to close because of  "3,000 unnecessary beds."

The year after the hospital closed, Holliswood Hospital, a psychiatric hospital, bought the building.

References

Hospitals in Queens, New York
Hospitals established in 1947